James "Jim" Davies (born 23 February 1882 – 30 June 1971) was a Welsh rugby union, and professional rugby league footballer nicknamed "The Dancing Master" who played in the 1900s, 1910s and 1920s, and coached rugby league in the 1920s.

Playing career

International honours
Jim Davies won 3 caps for Wales (RL) in 1909–1912 while at Huddersfield, and won caps for Great Britain (RL) while at Huddersfield in 1911 against Australia, and in 1912 against Australia.

County Cup Final appearances
Jim Davies played  in Huddersfield's 2–8 defeat by Wakefield Trinity in the 1910 Yorkshire County Cup Final during the 1910–11 season at Headingley Rugby Stadium, Leeds on Saturday 3 December 1910.

Club career
In the 1911–12 season, Jim Davies became the first Welshman to score more than 200-points in a season, he made his final appearance for Huddersfield in April of the 1919–20 season.

References

External links
Team – Past Players – D at swansearfc.co.uk
Profile at swansearfc.co.uk

1882 births
1971 deaths
Footballers who switched code
Great Britain national rugby league team players
Huddersfield Giants players
Keighley Cougars coaches
Place of birth missing
Place of death missing
Rugby league five-eighths
Rugby league halfbacks
Swansea RFC players
Wales national rugby league team players
Welsh rugby league coaches
Welsh rugby league players
Welsh rugby union players
Yorkshire rugby league team players